Route 365 is a 28 km north–south regional road in Quebec, Canada, linking Neuville and Saint-Raymond. It is the main road linking Autoroute 40 (exit 281) and the Quebec City area to St-Raymond and Pont-Rouge.

Pont-Rouge is the only city it goes through, where it overlaps Route 358 for only 400 meters.

Municipalities along Route 365
 Saint-Raymond-de-Portneuf
 Pont-Rouge
 Neuville

See also
 List of Quebec provincial highways

References

External links  
 Provincial Route Map (Courtesy of the Quebec Ministry of Transportation) 
 Route 365 on Google Maps

365
Roads in Capitale-Nationale